The 22nd Toronto Film Critics Association Awards, honoring the best in film for 2018, were awarded on December 9, 2018.

Winners

References

2018
2018 film awards
2018 in Toronto
2018 in Canadian cinema